Lugu Township is a rural township located in the southwest of Nantou County, Taiwan. Lugu is known as the home of Dongding Oolong Tea, which was first cultivated on Dong Ding Mountain in the area.

Administrative divisions
Lugu, Zhangya, Guangxing, Yonglong, Fenghuang, Neihu, Heya, Zhulin, Zhufeng, Chuxiang, Xiufeng, Qingshui and Ruitian Village

Economy
 Dong Ding tea

Tourist attractions
 Fonghuanggu Bird and Ecology Park
 Jiji Weir
 Ming Shan Resort
 Xitou Nature Education Area

Transportation
County Road 139:Lugu － Shuili
County Road 151:Jhushan － Sun Link Sea Highway

References

External links

 Lugu Township Office, Nantou County

Townships in Nantou County